Palaeornis, the epauletted parakeets is a proposed genus of birds named for the red markings on their upper wings resembling epaulettes. Formerly included in the genus Psittacula, this group of birds comprises two species, only one of which is still extant. The genus name was formerly deprecated until it was revived in 2019 by a molecular study on the taxonomics of the genus Psittacula, splitting it into 10 genera, which has been accepted by the IUCN Redlist.

 P. eupatria (Alexandrine parakeet) 
 P. wardi (Seychelles parakeet)

References

Psittacidae
Bird genera